Zhou Dawen (1895–1971) was a politician of the Republic of China. He was born in Wuxi, Jiangsu. He was aligned with the Fengtian clique before joining the Nationalist government. He was the 19th mayor of Beijing.

After his political career, he became a famous chef. His children included Olympic athlete Chow Chang Sing (Zhou Changxing) along with Peking opera artists Zhou Changyun and Liu Changyu (born Zhou Changyu).

References

Bibliography
 
 
 

1895 births
1971 deaths
Republic of China politicians from Jiangsu
Mayors of Beijing
Members of the Fengtian clique
Politicians from Wuxi
Chinese chefs